BBCode ("Bulletin Board Code") is a lightweight markup language used to format messages in many Internet forum software. It was first introduced in 1998. The available "tags" of BBCode are usually indicated by square brackets ([ and ]) surrounding a keyword, and are parsed before being translated into HTML.

Tags

Implementation 
BBCode is typically implemented by applying a series of regular expression string-replace operations upon the input. Because regular expressions are limited in analyzing the structure of text input, this has the artifact that any non-hierarchical BBCode input will be transformed into invalid non-hierarchical HTML without error.

See also
 Markdown

References

External links 
 BBCode users guide
 RTF/HTML to BBCode online converter
Lightweight markup languages